Bridge of Spies is the debut album by British pop group T'Pau, released in September 1987. For its US release, Virgin Records renamed Bridge of Spies to simply T'Pau.

Overview 
The album was produced by Roy Thomas Baker. It spawned five hit singles – "Heart and Soul" (also a Top 5 in the US), the best-selling number one hit "China in Your Hand" (re-recorded especially for single release), "Valentine," a live version of "Sex Talk" (previously released in its original form as "Intimate Strangers") was issued in the UK, and "I Will Be with You". A further release, a remix of the title track "Bridge of Spies", was also released in the US, Canada, Australia and Germany.

The artwork for the release includes the name "T'Pau" rearranged to form a face (similar to the Moai stone heads found on Easter Island). This practice was replicated with the titles of the band's follow-up albums Rage and The Promise.

The album spent one week at number one on the UK Albums Chart and was certified Gold on 14 October 1987 and Platinum on 18 November 1987.
It was eventually certified 4× Platinum in September 1988.

An extended and digitally remastered version of Bridge of Spies was released in the UK and Europe in 2017. It includes remixes, B-sides and live versions of the album tracks. A companion album called The Virgin Anthology was released shortly afterwards, and this triple CD and DVD contains the radio edits and remixes of all the singles released from Bridge of Spies and digitally remastered versions of the follow up albums Rage and The Promise.

Track listing 
All songs written by Carol Decker and Ron Rogers. (Copyright Virgin Music)

Side one
 "Heart and Soul" – 4:16
 "I Will Be with You" – 4:05
 "China in Your Hand" – 5:06
 "Friends Like These" – 3:45
 "Sex Talk" – 4:14

Side two
 "Bridge of Spies" – 5:23
 "Monkey House" – 4:24
 "Valentine" – 3:58
 "Thank You for Goodbye" – 3:54
 "You Give Up" – 4.39
 "China in Your Hand" (reprise) – 0:45

Chart performance

Production 
 Produced by Roy Thomas Baker
 Engineered and mixed by Jerry Napier

Personnel 
 Carol Decker – all vocals
 Ronnie Rogers – guitars
 Tim Burgess – drums, percussion
 Michael Chetwood – keyboards
 Paul Jackson – bass
 Taj Wyzgowski – guitars
 Peter Ballin – tenor saxophone
 Gary Barnacle – tenor saxophone (single version of "China in Your Hand")

View from a Bridge 
A video of the following selected tracks was released as View from a Bridge in 1988 on VHS and LaserDisc.

 "Intro"
 "Heart and Soul"
 "Bridge of Spies"
 "China in Your Hand"
 "Valentine"
 "Sex Talk"

Sales and certifications

References

External links

1987 debut albums
T'Pau (band) albums
Albums produced by Roy Thomas Baker